Cap-Vert, or the Cape Verde Peninsula, is a peninsula in Senegal and the westernmost point of the continent of Africa and of the Afro-Eurasia mainland. Portuguese explorers called it Cabo Verde or "Green Cape". The Cape Verde islands,  further west, are named after the cape. Dakar, the capital of Senegal, occupies parts including its southern tip.

Formed by a combination of volcanic offshore islands and a land bridge produced by coastal currents, the cape projects into the Atlantic Ocean, bending back to the southeast at its tip. Exposure to southwesterly winds contributes to Cape Verde's seasonal verdant appearance, in contrast to the undulating yellow dunes to the north.

Near Pointe des Almadies, the north-western tip of the cape, lies Léopold Sédar Senghor International Airport, which was used as a transatlantic ferrying point during World War II. Twin volcanic cones, the Deux Mamelles ("Two Teats"), dominate the landscape along the coast northwest of Dakar. The peninsula encloses a bay and a natural harbour in the southwest.

The indigenous inhabitants of the peninsula, the Lebou, lived as fishermen and farmers. Since about 1444, when the Portuguese first sighted the cape, it has been an entrepôt for African-European trade. The French later established the city of Dakar on the cape in 1857.

References

External links 

 Satellite picture by Google Maps

Landforms of Senegal
Peninsulas of Africa
Dakar